Pamela Chopra (née Singh; born 1938) is an Indian playback singer. She is the wife of veteran Bollywood film director Yash Chopra and is also a film writer and producer in her own rights.

Early life
Chopra was born as Pamela Singh, the daughter of Mohinder Singh, an officer in the Indian Army. The eldest of three children, she has two younger brothers. Since her father was posted in several remote locations all over India, Chopra was educated at several army schools. She is a cousin of the actress Simi Garewal. Chopra's father Mohinder Singh and Garewal's mother Darshi Garewal were siblings.

Marriage
Pamela married the film-maker Yash Chopra in 1970. The marriage was arranged by their families in the traditional Indian manner. The two families had a common friend, the mother of film-maker Romesh Sharma (producer of the blockbuster Hum). Sharma contacted the wife of BR Chopra and suggested that Pamela Singh would be 'the ideal bride' for BR's younger brother Yash Chopra. "She was not wrong because we had a wonderful marriage", Pamela was to say forty years later in an interview. The couple met each other for the first time in a formal setting and found each other agreeable. The wedding was held in 1970.

They have two sons together, Aditya (b. 1971) and Uday (b. 1973). Aditya is a film producer and director. He is married to actress Rani Mukerji. Uday is an actor and film producer.

Career
Chopra has dabbled in several fields connected to film. She has sung several film songs, all of them for her husband's films, from Kabhie Kabhie (1976) to Mujhse Dosti Karoge! (2002). Her name also appeared in the capacity of 'producer' on the credits of certain films made by her husband. However, the 1993 film Aaina was independently produced by her. Pamela co-wrote the script of her husband's 1997 film Dil To Pagal Hai along with her husband Yash Chopra, her son Aditya Chopra and professional writer Tanuja Chandra. She has appeared on screen on one single occasion: in the opening song "Ek Duje Ke Vaaste" of the film Dil To Pagal Hai, where she and her husband appeared together. As a schoolgirl, Pamela had learnt Bharatanatyam, but she has never performed in public.

Selected filmography

Playback singer

Other roles

References

External links
 

Place of birth missing (living people)
Living people
Hindi film producers
Bollywood playback singers
1938 births
Indian women film producers
Indian women playback singers
20th-century Indian singers
21st-century Indian singers
Hindi screenwriters
Indian women screenwriters
21st-century Indian women singers
20th-century Indian businesswomen
20th-century Indian businesspeople
21st-century Indian businesswomen
21st-century Indian businesspeople
20th-century Indian women singers